The Benham Mound is a Native American mound in the southwestern part of the U.S. state of Ohio.  Located in modern Amberley Village in Hamilton County, the mound is an archaeological site.

The location of the mound is on a hilltop that overlooks the valley of a tributary creek that flows west into the Mill Creek, which correlates with Section 30 of the original Columbia Township, near the Montgomery turnpike (now U.S. Route 22), that is, near end of present-day Grand Vista Avenue.

During the late nineteenth century, local residents partially excavated the mound and the ground around it; their diggings revealed significant amounts of mica and divers types of stone tools, including axes, scrapers, chisels, and flint projectile points.  These findings, combined with the location of the mound itself, have led archaeologists to conclude that Benham Mound was built by people of the Hopewell tradition.  Because of its archaeological value, the Benham Mound was listed on the National Register of Historic Places in 1974.

References

National Register of Historic Places in Hamilton County, Ohio
Ohio Hopewell
Archaeological sites in Hamilton County, Ohio
Archaeological sites on the National Register of Historic Places in Ohio
Mounds in Ohio